Archer Christopher Staniforth (26 September 1895 – 1954) was an English footballer who played for Mansfield Town, Notts County and Oldham Athletic.

References

1895 births
1954 deaths
English footballers
Association football forwards
English Football League players
Notts County F.C. players
Oldham Athletic A.F.C. players
Mansfield Town F.C. players